Corixinae is a subfamily of aquatic bugs in the family Corixidae. There are at least 130 described species in Corixinae.

Genera
 Arctocorisa Wallengren, 1894
 Callicorixa White, 1873
 Cenocorixa Hungerford, 1948
 Centrocorisa Lundblad, 1928
 Corisella Lundblad, 1928
 Corixa Geoffroy, 1762
 Dasycorixa Hungerford, 1948
 Glaenocorisa Thomson, 1869
 Graptocorixa Hungerford, 1930
 Hesperocorixa Kirkaldy, 1908
 Morphocorixa Jaczewski, 1931
 Neocorixa Hungerford, 1925
 Palmacorixa Abbott, 1912
 Palmocorixa
 Pseudocorixa Jaczewski, 1931
 Ramphocorixa Abbott, 1912
 Sigara Fabricius, 1775
 Trichocorixa Kirkaldy, 1908

References

 Thomas J. Henry, Richard C. Froeschner. (1988). Catalog of the Heteroptera, True Bugs of Canada and the Continental United States. Brill Academic Publishers.

Further reading

External links
 NCBI Taxonomy Browser, Corixinae

 
Corixidae